The 1925 Washington & Jefferson Presidents football team was an American football team that represented Washington & Jefferson College as an independent during the 1925 college football season.  In its eighth and final season under head coach David C. Morrow, the team compiled a 6–2–1 record and outscored opponents by a total of 165 to 50. The team played its home games at College Field in Washington, Pennsylvania.

On October 17, 1925, during a game against Carnegie Tech, a large section of the old wooden stands at College Field collapsed 300 to 400 spectators into Chartiers Creek.

Schedule

References

Washington and Jefferson
Washington & Jefferson Presidents football seasons
Washington and Jefferson Presidents football